Alladiya Khan (10 August 1855 – 16 March 1946) was an Indian Hindustani classical singer who founded the Jaipur-Atrauli gharana, also referred as just Jaipur Gharana. He is recognized for his revival, reinterpretation, and creations of many rare raags, compositions, and techniques and for producing disciples like Bhaskarbuwa Bakhale, Kesarbai Kerkar, and Mogubai Kurdikar.

Background
Alladiya Khan was born on August 10, 1855, at Uniara, a small village in  Tonk, Rajasthan, (then under the Jaipur State) to a Shia Muslim family of musicians.

Ancestry
Khan claims ancestry from Nath Vishwambhar, an ancestor of Swami Haridas. Having converted to Islam during the Mughal era, Khan's family traces its history to the Adya Gaud Brahmins of Shandilya gotra.

Musical training
Though his father Ahmed Khan died early in his life, Khan's uncle, Jehangir (of Jaipur), taught him dhrupad for 5 years and then khyal for another 8 years. Khan would practice palta exercises for six hours daily well into his 50s.

Career
Alladiya Khan served in the court of various kings of Rajasthan, including that of Amlata.

Setback
Due to overextension of the voice at the request of his patron, Khan lost his voice in his late-30s for nearly two years. His recuperated voice is said to have not regained the quality and sensitivity he had employed earlier. These limitations resulted in the conception of what would become the Jaipur gayaki.

Touring
Khan traveled to Bihar, Patna, Allahabad, Nepal, and Baroda for some years in the early part of his life to perform for kings.

Kolhapur (1895-1922)
Later, Khan settled down in Kolhapur with his family as the court musician of Shahu Maharaj.

Mumbai
In 1922, he moved to Mumbai after the king died. He taught many disciples and sang in many mehfils in Mumbai. There, he grew fond of natya sangeet singers like Balgandharva and continued to teach his students until his death. Alladiya Khan died in Bombay on 16 March 1946.

His autobiography, as narrated to his grandson Azizzudin Khan Sahab, is available in English translation, as My Life, with an introduction by Amlan Dasgupta and Urmila Bhirdikar, published by Thema, Kolkata, 2000.

Musicianship

Repertoire
Alladiya Khan was acknowledged for his creation and resurrection of many complex Raags such as Nat Kamod, Bhoop Nat, Kaunsi Kanada, Sampoorna Malkauns, Basanti Kedar, Shuddha Nat, Malavi, Savani Kalyan, DhavalaShree.

Many of these Raags were sung in the Havelis in northern Rajasthan, where Khansahab grew up. From Haveli Sangeet tradition, Khansahab brought many of the Raags in the realm of live concerts and also created Raags and Bandishes rooted in them. One of the Raags he resurrected was Raag Basanti Kanada. Few of the many Haveli sangeet dhrupads which he made into bandishes were the famous Raag Nayaki Kanada Bandish "Mero Piya Rasiya" and Bihagda Bandish "Ae Pyaari pag hole". "Khan Saheb had never allowed his voice to be recorded."

Students
Khansahab's major disciples were Azmat Hussain Khan, his own younger brother Haider Khan (also spelled Hyder Khan), his own sons, Manji Khan and Bhurji Khan, and his grandson Azizuddin Khansahab.

Apart from the members of his family, Khansahab's initial disciples were Tanibai Ghorpade, Bhaskarbuwa Bakhale, Kesarbai Kerkar, Mogubai Kurdikar, Govindrao Shaligram, and Gulubhai Jasdanwalla.

Extension of legacy 
Alladiya Khan's students played a major part in extending the influence of Jaipur Gharana.

Alladiya Khan's eldest son, Nasiruddin "Badeji" Khan (1886-1966), could not pursue singing as a profession because of health reasons, so Manji Khan and Bhurji Khan took forward the tradition. Manji Khan, Alladiya Khan's second son, had started teaching Mallikarjun Mansur in 1935, but Manji Khan died in 1937 (around March 1937); so it was Bhurji Khan, the youngest son, who passed on the gayaki of his father. Mallikarjun Mansur and Dhondutai Kulkarni are among the noted disciples of Bhurji Khan. Gajanan-buwa Joshi of Agra Gharana also received guidance from Bhurji Khan. Haider Khan's disciples included Mogubai Kurdikar, Laxmibai Jadhav, and his son Naththan Khan. Noted musicologist Vamanrao Deshpande was Naththan Khan's student. But Naththan Khan died in 1946, just a few weeks after Alladiya Khan's death. Mogibai Kurdikar's students include famous names like her daughter Kishori Amonkar, musicologist Vamanrao Deshpande, Kausalya Manjeshwar, Padma Talwalkar.

Legacy
The Annual Ustad Alladiya Khan Music Festival is celebrated in Mumbai and Dharwad each year, where several singers and musicians perform, giving homage to Alladiya Khan.

Recordings
Khan was adamant about not having his voice and style recorded for fear of copyright. Though, there have been suspicions that ambiguous recordings may belong to Khan or his kin. A recording of a thumri is alleged to be featuring Khan singing.

In popular culture
In 2007, the story of Dhondutai Kulkarni, disciple of the legendary Bhurji Khan, was the subject of Namita Devidayal's debut novel, The Music Room.

Further reading
 Khansahab Alladiya Khan, (as told to his grandson Azizuddin Khan). Translated and introduced by Amlan Dasgupta and Urmila Bhirdikar. Thema, 2000. .
 Alladiya Khan Between Two Tanpuras, by Vamana Hari Deshpande, Popular Prakashan, 1989. , . page 40.

References

External links
Official Website: Alladiya Khan
Chembur.com article on Alladiya by Vamanrao Deshpande

1855 births
1946 deaths
Hindustani singers
People from Aligarh district
19th-century Indian male classical singers
Indian music educators
20th-century Indian male classical singers
Singers from Rajasthan
Vocal gharanas
Jaipur gharana
20th-century Khyal singers